MOA-2007-BLG-192Lb, occasionally shortened to MOA-192 b, is an extrasolar planet approximately 3,000 light-years away in the constellation of Sagittarius.  The planet was discovered orbiting the brown dwarf or low-mass star MOA-2007-BLG-192L. At a mass of approximately 3.3 times Earth, it is one of the lowest-mass extrasolar planets at the time of discovery. It was found when it caused a gravitational microlensing event on May 24, 2007, which was detected as part of the MOA-II microlensing survey at the Mount John University Observatory in New Zealand.

The system's primary is small as well. At roughly 6% the mass of the Sun, it is probably too small to sustain fusion reactions, making it a dimly glowing brown dwarf. Also, the estimated projected distance between MOA-2007-BLG-192Lb and its primary is approximately 0.62 astronomical units. That means the planet probably formed with much ice and gases, more like Neptune (an ice giant planet) in composition than Earth (a terrestrial planet), according to astronomer David Bennett of the University of Notre Dame.

References

External links 
 

Sagittarius (constellation)
Super-Earths
Terrestrial planets
Exoplanets discovered in 2008
Exoplanets detected by microlensing